League tables for teams participating in Kolmonen, the fourth tier of the Finnish soccer league system, in 2005.

League tables

Helsinki and Uusimaa

Section 1

Section 2

Section 3

South-East Finland, Kaakkois-Suomi

Relegation playoff

First Leg
Purha         0-0 HiHa

Second Leg
HiHa          2-7 Purha

Purha promoted, HiHa relegated.

Central Finland, Keski-Suomi

Relegation playoff

First Leg 
FCV/Reds      2-2 JPS

Second Leg 
JPS           3-0 FCV/Reds

JPS remain at fourth level.

Eastern Finland, Itä-Suomi 

NB: Zulimanit withdrew from Promotion Playoff and SiPS took their place.

Northern Finland, Pohjois-Suomi

Central Ostrobothnia, Keski-Pohjanmaa

Preliminary stage

NB: LoVe withdrew before the start of the season.

Relegation playoff Group

(preliminary stage points included)

Relegation playoff

First Leg 
HBK           0-4 Reima

Second Leg 
Reima         5-2 HBK

Reima remain at fourth level.

Vaasa

Preliminary stage

NB: PeIK withdrew before the start of the season.

Relegation playoff Group
(preliminary stage points included)

Vaasa/Central Ostrobothnia Promotion Playoff Group

NB: Öja-73 withdrew from Promotion Playoff and NIK took their place.

Satakunta

Tampere

Relegation playoff
Härmä 5-0 FC Vapsi

Härmä promoted, FC Vapsi relegated.

Turku and Åland, Turku and Ahvenanmaa

Promotion Playoff

Promotion Playoff Group A
City Stars    6-0 LoPa
MPS           bye

Round 2
MPS           2-1 City Stars
LoPa          bye

Round 3
LoPa          0-3 MPS
City Stars    bye

Final Table:

Promotion Playoff Group B
Round 1 
PS-44         1-0 FC Rauma
TuTo          bye

Round 2 
TuTo          0-4 PS-44
FC Rauma      bye

Round 3 
FC Rauma      4-3 TuTo
PS-44         bye

Final Table:

Promotion Playoff Group C
Round 1 
SiPS          1-3 JJK II
KTP           bye

Round 2 
KTP           5-0 SiPS
JJK II        bye

Round 3 
JJK II        2-1 KTP
SiPS          bye

Final Table:

Promotion Playoff Group D

Round 1
Lynx          4-0 NIK
Norrvalla FF  bye

Round 2
NIK           2-1 Norrvalla FF
Lynx          bye

Round 3
Norrvalla FF  0-7 Lynx
NIK           bye

Final Table:

Footnotes

References and sources
Finnish FA
ResultCode

Kolmonen seasons
4
Finland
Finland